Kops is a surname. Notable people with the surname include:

Alexander Kops, Dutch politician
Bernard Kops, British writer
Erland Kops (1937–2017), Danish badminton player
Hailey Kops (born 2002), Israeli pair skater
James Kops, Papuan rugby player
Jan Kops (1765-1849), Dutch agronomist
Poul Kops, Danish boxer

See also
Raquel Kops-Jones, American tennis-player
Kubernetes, a computing platform whose setup tool is called "kops"